Grove Township is one of twelve townships in Humboldt County, Iowa, USA. As of the 2000 census, its population was 316.

History
Grove Township was organized in 1873.

Geography

Cities, towns, villages
Arnold (unincorporated)
A community named Randolph contained a post office from 1874 to 1875. A post office also existed for the community Arnold, formerly Grove, from 1900 to 1929. Both of these historic communities were located in the northwest corner of Grove Township.

Adjacent townships
 Humboldt Township (north)
 Vernon Township (northeast)
 Lake Township (east)
 Norway Township (southeast)
 Beaver Township (south)
 Corinth Township (southwest)
 Rutland Township (west)
 Delana Township (northwest)

Cemeteries
The township contains Hands Grove Township Cemetery.

Political districts
 Iowa's 4th congressional district
 State House District 4

References
 United States Census Bureau 2008 TIGER/Line Shapefiles
 United States Board on Geographic Names (GNIS)
 United States National Atlas

External links
 US-Counties.com
 City-Data.com

Townships in Humboldt County, Iowa
Populated places established in 1873
Townships in Iowa